Young Dracula is a 2011 short horror film written and directed by Alf Seccombe. The cast includes artist and musician Kyle Field of the band Little Wings, and American television news correspondent Su-chin Pak.

The film won Second Prize for Bay Area Shorts at the 54th San Francisco International Film Festival.

References

External links

American short films
2011 films
2010s English-language films
2011 horror films
2011 short films